Bart Crashley (born June 15, 1946) is a Canadian former professional ice hockey defenceman who played 148 games in the National Hockey League and 140 games in the World Hockey Association. He played for the Detroit Red Wings, Los Angeles Sharks, Kansas City Scouts, and Los Angeles Kings between 1965 and 1976.

Playing career
Crashley was promising rushing defenceman in his rookie year of 1967–68 with Detroit where he wore jersey #15 and was paired with Gary Bergman. His style of play was not encouraged by coach Sid Abel who reportedly instructed Crashley to not carry the puck past his own blueline. Crashley was subsequently traded to Montreal where he played in their farm system.

Crashley was selected by the New York Islanders in 1972 expansion draft, but opted to join Los Angeles Sharks of the World Hockey Association, spending two seasons there. He returned to the NHL in 1974 with the expansion Kansas City Scouts, wearing #4. He returned to Detroit via a trade halfway through that season where he again wore #4. Went to the Los Angeles Kings along with Marcel Dionne in a blockbuster trade. He played four games for the Kings, spending most of the season in the minor leagues. 

After two more seasons in the minors Crashley went to Austria, where he served as player-coach of Villacher SV during the 1979–80 season. He retired from playing and coached full time, though returned to play in 1983 with Innsbrucker EV for two seasons before retiring for good in 1985.

Post-playing career 
After retiring from playing in 1980 Crashley became a coach in the Austrian Hockey League, and served as player-coach during his comeback from 1983 to 1985. He coached in Austria until 1993. In 1998–99 he was the assistant coach of the Guelph Storm of the Ontario Hockey League, and in 2007–08 coached the Couchiching Terriers of the Ontario Junior Hockey League. He also coached of the Campbellford Rebels of the Empire B Junior C Hockey League in 2012–13.

Career statistics

Regular season and playoffs

External links 

1946 births
Living people
Binghamton Dusters players
Canadian ice hockey coaches
Canadian ice hockey defencemen
Detroit Red Wings players
EC VSV players
Fort Worth Texans players
Fort Worth Wings players
Hamilton Red Wings (OHA) players
Innsbrucker EV players
Kansas City Scouts players
Los Angeles Kings players
Los Angeles Sharks players
Memphis Wings players
Montreal Voyageurs players
Pittsburgh Hornets players
Ice hockey people from Toronto
Springfield Indians players